B36 may refer to:
 B36 (New York City bus) in Brooklyn
 B36 Tórshavn, a Faroese football team
 Convair B-36 Peacemaker, a Cold War era strategic bomber
 B-36 Peacemaker Museum, an organization associated with the above aircraft
 B36, a quasi-planar allotropic molecule composed of pure boron, the first known borophene